Richard Frank Satterthwaite (born December 11, 1949), popularly known as Richard Mabala, is a British-born Tanzanian author, social activist, columnist and academic, predominantly recognized for his tale books Hawa The Bus Driver, Mabala The Farmer and Run Free which won him a CODE's Burt Award for African Literature.

Biography 
Mabala was born in the United Kingdom. He moved to Tanzania in 1973 as a volunteer with the Voluntary Service Overseas. He was one of the first five British volunteers to be allowed into the country after Tanzania broke off diplomatic relations with Britain over the independence of Zimbabwe and became a Tanzanian citizen in 1982 after giving up his passport to become an official Tanzanian. He also served as a professor at the university of Dar es Salaam.

Literary works

Books

Other literary works 
 2008: Youth and The Hood (Environment and Urbanization)
 2012/2013: Sisi ni sisimizi, Musa si Mzigo and Soma Kabula Soma
 2007: Makengeza (in Mwananchi) and Binti Hidaya (in Raia Mwema)

References

Further notes

External links 
Richard Mabala on Twitter

Tanzanian writers
1949 births
Living people